Granite Hot Springs is a hot spring located in Sublette County, Wyoming,  southeast of Jackson.  It is maintained by the United States Forest Service.  Early settlers in the region dug a pool to collect the water.  The Civilian Conservation Corps enhanced the pool in 1933 according to the sign at the pool, adding a campground, changing room, and deck.  There is also a primitive pool located at Granite Falls, about 1/2 mile downstream, which was one of the locations used to shoot the 1992 film A River Runs Through It.

During the summer, the pool can be accessed by car. In the winter, visitors must access it by skis, snowshoes, snowmobile or dogsled. In winter, the pool temperature may be up to  degrees.  During peak snowmelt in spring, the temperature may drop into the 80s, and be in the mid-90s during the summer.

References

External links
 Wyoming tourism
 Via magazine article
 USDA Forest Service recreation area information

Hot springs of Wyoming
Hot springs of Teton County, Wyoming
Civilian Conservation Corps in Wyoming
Tourist attractions in Teton County, Wyoming
Bridger–Teton National Forest